Guo Ruilong (born 1 December 1943) is a Chinese football coach and former footballer.

Playing career
Born in Kunming, Guo returned to his hometown Beijing in 1946 after the Second Sino-Japanese War ended. He began his football career for Beijing Team's youth team and later graduated to the senior team in 1965. He became a football coach after his retirement in 1975.

Management career
He served for Inner Mongolia, Beijing Youth and China national youth between 1976 and 1989. In 1990, Guo was appointed as the assistant coach of Beijing Team. On 9 May 2000, Guo joined Chinese Jia-B League club Chengdu Wuniu who struggled in the bottom of league, and helped the club stay in the second tier for the next season. He was sacked by Chengdu on 16 September 2001. He became the assistant coach of top-tier club Shenzhen Ping'an in December 2001. He was appointed as the team's manager on 17 May 2005 after Chi Shangbin's dismission. Despite severe financial problems, Guo led Shenzhen to reach the 2005 AFC Champions League semi-finals before heavily defeated by UAE champions Al Ain 6–0. He was suddenly sacked on 14 October 2005.

Guo returned to football in December 2007 when he accepted the invitation of China League One club Anhui Jiufang. On 15 April 2008, he resigned from the team due to "health problems". He joined China League Two club Wenzhou Tomorrow in June 2008. Guo became the manager of League Two club Hebei Zhongji on 16 August 2013. Although Hebei Zhongji won promotion in the 2013 season by finishing the runners-up in League Two, he didn't extent his contract and left the club.

Honours

Player
Beijing Team
China national league: 1983

References

1943 births
Living people
Chinese footballers
Footballers from Yunnan
Sportspeople from Kunming
Footballers from Beijing
Chinese football managers
Hebei F.C. managers
Association footballers not categorized by position